WVCN (104.3 FM) is a radio station broadcasting a religious format owned by VCY America. Licensed to Baraga, Michigan, it first began broadcasting under its current format in 1999.

Programming
WVCN's programming includes Christian Talk and Teaching programming including; Crosstalk, Worldview Weekend with Brannon Howse, Grace to You with John MacArthur, In Touch with Dr. Charles Stanley, Love Worth Finding with Adrian Rogers, Revive Our Hearts with Nancy Leigh DeMoss, The Alternative with Tony Evans, Liberty Council's Faith and Freedom Report, Thru the Bible with J. Vernon McGee, Joni and Friends, Unshackled!, and Moody Radio's Stories of Great Christians.

WVCN also airs a variety of vocal and instrumental traditional Christian Music, as well as children's programming such as Ranger Bill.

References

External links
 

Moody Radio affiliate stations
Radio stations established in 1997
VCN-FM
VCY America stations